Gregoire Lake is a lake in Alberta, Canada

Gregoire Lake or variation, may also refer to:

 Lake Gregoire, a fluvial lake on the Faucher River in Mauricie, Quebec, Canada
 Gregoire Lake Estates (Gregoire Lake), a hamlet in Wood Buffalo, Alberta, Canada
 Gregoire Lake Provincial Park, Wood Buffalo, Alberta, Canada
 Gregoire Lake 176 (Gregoire Lake), an Indian reserve of the Fort McMurray First Nation in Wood Buffalo, Alberta, Canada
 Gregoire Lake 176A (Gregoire Lake A), an Indian reserve of the Fort McMurray First Nation in Wood Buffalo, Alberta, Canada
 Gregoire Lake 176B (Gregoire Lake B), an Indian reserve of the Fort McMurray First Nation in Wood Buffalo, Alberta, Canada

See also

 Fort McMurray First Nation, the people of the Gregoire Lake Indian Reserves
 Gregoire (disambiguation)
 Lake (disambiguation)
 Lake Gregory (disambiguation)